Lionel Glenn Robert Ainsworth (born 1 October 1987) is an English footballer who plays for AFC Sudbury as a right winger. He has previously played for multiple Football League and non-league clubs as well as in the Scottish Premiership. He was capped at youth level by England, featuring for England U19 after joining the Derby senior squad.

Career

Derby County
Ainsworth was born in Derby and started his career at Derby County, signing his first professional contract on 4 August 2005. He made his first team debut on 25 February 2006 in a 1–0 home win over Plymouth Argyle, coming on as a late substitute for Kevin Lisbie. His second and final first team appearance for Derby came in a 5–0 defeat to Reading on 1 April 2006, again as a substitute.

Ainsworth spent the first four months of the 2006–07 season on loan at League One side AFC Bournemouth, but made only nine appearances. In January 2007, he joined Conference side Halifax Town for a month, scoring his first senior goal on his debut against York City. Soon after his return to Derby, he joined League Two side Wycombe Wanderers on loan until the end of the season, where he made seven appearances before being recalled in April.

Hereford United
He was released by Derby at the end of the 2006–07 season and was signed by Hereford United, who were about to start their second season back in the Football League. He quickly established his place in the side and featured in every first team match bar one, during his time with the Bulls. In only his second match he scored his first senior hat-trick in a 4–1 League Cup first round win over Yeovil Town. He went on to score another hat-trick, this time in a 3–2 league win at Stockport County. Ainsworth's last match for Hereford saw him score a 3rd-minute winner against Leeds United, in the FA Cup First Round.

Watford
Ainsworth's performances for Hereford saw Watford sign him initially on loan, with Watford manager Aidy Boothroyd extending the loans of Toumani Diagouraga and Theo Robinson to Hereford until the end of the season as part of the transfer deal. He also gave Hereford first option on Diagouraga, which the Bulls duly utilised in the summer of 2008. On 5 January 2008, Ainsworth signed for Watford permanently for an undisclosed six figure fee, agreeing a contract until the end of the 2009–10 season.

On 16 November 2008, Watford caretaker manager Malky Mackay named Ainsworth as one of three players that were to be loaned to other clubs to gain match fitness. Four days later Ainsworth rejoined Hereford United on a month's loan, on the anniversary of his final match for the Bulls. He scored three more goals for United in the 2008–09 season including a brace and two assists against Oldham Athletic in a 5–0 hammering. Following that performance, Ainsworth was recalled to Watford with one game still left on his loan deal.

Huddersfield Town
On 23 January 2009, Ainsworth was signed by Football League One side Huddersfield Town on a two-and-a-half-year contract. His debut came as a substitute for Keigan Parker in the 1–0 defeat by Yeovil Town at Huish Park on 27 January 2009. His first start for the Terriers came in the 1–0 win over Peterborough United on 31 January 2009.

After a period of being left out of the side altogether, Ainsworth moved on loan to fellow League One side Brentford on 27 January 2010. He made his debut in the 4–0 win over Gillingham at Griffin Park on 6 February 2010. After making his first start for the Bees, against Yeovil in April 2010, he got in trouble with the club's manager Andy Scott, having gone straight down the tunnel after being substituted. Afterwards Scott said that Ainsworth wouldn't play for the club again for showing disrespect to the club and its fans, and he was sent back to Huddersfield.

A season of mixed fortunes led to Ainsworth looking for a transfer away from Huddersfield. Rival clubs Shrewsbury Town & Hereford United were rumoured to be interested in him. At a fans forum on 21 July 2010 Hereford's manager Simon Davey confirmed he had made an approach to Huddersfield.

Shrewsbury Town
Ainsworth signed a two-year deal with Shrewsbury Town during the 2010–11 pre-season on a free transfer, with Huddersfield gaining 20% of any future sell on fee by Shrewsbury. He made his league debut for Shrewsbury Town on 7 August 2010, with a man of the match performance in a 3–1 victory against Bradford City on the opening day of the 2010–11 season. He scored his first goal for Shrewsbury Town against Rotherham United on 4 September 2010, the only goal of the game in a 1–0 win at the Greenhous Meadow. Ainsworth got his first hat-trick for Shrewsbury Town in a 5–1 win against Lincoln City on Tuesday 8 February 2011. He finished the season with 9 goals, the majority from the wing.

At the beginning of the 2011–12 season, Ainsworth played a big part in Shrewsbury's League Cup wins against former club Derby County and Premier League club Swansea City to set up a third round clash with Arsenal. On 6 March 2012, Ainsworth joined fellow Football League Two side Burton Albion on a one-month loan deal. In May 2012, Ainsworth was released by Shrewsbury after being told his contract would not be renewed.

Rotherham United
Ainsworth signed for Rotherham United on 18 June 2012. He scored his first goal for the club on his debut on 11 August 2012, in a League Cup game against Hull City, in which Rotherham lost 7–6 on penalties after drawing 1–1 against the Championship side. He made his league début on 18 August, in a 3–0 win against Burton Albion in the club's first ever competitive game at the New York Stadium.

On 21 January 2013, Ainsworth signed for Aldershot Town on loan.

Motherwell
On 29 August 2013, Ainsworth signed on loan for Motherwell until January 2014. He scored his first goal on his second appearance for Motherwell against Dundee United on 22 September 2013. On 3 January 2014, after four goals in four appearances, Ainsworth's loan was extended to the end of the season.

On 16 June 2014, Ainsworth signed for Motherwell permanently on a one-year deal. In the UEFA Europa League second qualifying round second leg match away against Stjarnan, Ainsworth scored his first European goal, but Motherwell lost 3–2, being eliminated 5–4 on aggregate. In May 2015, Ainsworth scored in both legs as Motherwell defeated Rangers 6–1 on aggregate in the Scottish Premiership Play-off Final to retain their place in the top flight. Following an incident at the final whistle of the second leg involving Motherwell's Lee Erwin and Fraser Kerr and Rangers' Bilel Mohsni which saw Kerr and Mohsni given red cards, two days later Ainsworth along with teammate Craig Moore received a two-match ban for his part in the incident.

On 24 June 2015, Ainsworth signed a new two-year contract with Motherwell.

Plymouth Argyle
On 30 May 2017, Ainsworth signed for Plymouth Argyle after turning down the offer of a new contract from Motherwell.

He was released by Plymouth Argyle at the end of the 2018–19 season.

Non-league spells
In August 2019, Ainsworth dropped down two divisions to join National League South side Weymouth, which had been newly promoted. He made his debut for the club as a second-half substitute in a 1–1 draw at Tonbridge Angels on 31 August.

Following a brief spell with Weymouth, Ainsworth went onto feature for the likes of Dulwich Hamlet, Welling United, Braintree Town and Heybridge Swifts before ultimately joining AFC Sudbury in July 2022.

International career
Ainsworth has represented England at youth level playing for the England U-17 and England U-18 sides. Ainsworth received his first call up for the England U-19 team shortly after breaking into the first team at Derby County.

Career statistics

References

External links

1987 births
Living people
Footballers from Nottingham
English footballers
Derby County F.C. players
Halifax Town A.F.C. players
AFC Bournemouth players
Wycombe Wanderers F.C. players
Hereford United F.C. players
Watford F.C. players
Huddersfield Town A.F.C. players
Brentford F.C. players
Shrewsbury Town F.C. players
Burton Albion F.C. players
Rotherham United F.C. players
Aldershot Town F.C. players
Motherwell F.C. players
English Football League players
National League (English football) players
Isthmian League players
Association football wingers
Scottish Professional Football League players
Plymouth Argyle F.C. players
Weymouth F.C. players
Dulwich Hamlet F.C. players
Welling United F.C. players
Braintree Town F.C. players
Heybridge Swifts F.C. players
A.F.C. Sudbury players